Mesaio is a village and a community of the Oraiokastro municipality. Before the 2011 local government reform it was part of the municipality of Kallithea, of which it was a municipal district. The 2011 census recorded 533 inhabitants in the village and 1,192 in the community. The community of Mesaio covers an area of 27.896 km2.

Administrative division
The community of Mesaio consists of three separate settlements: 
Mesaio (population 533)
Monolofo (population 370)
Petroto (population 289)
The aforementioned population figures are as of 2011.

See also
 List of settlements in the Thessaloniki regional unit

References

Populated places in Thessaloniki (regional unit)